An Evening with the Royal Ballet is a 1963 British documentary film produced by the British Home Entertainment for the Royal Ballet company.

The film contain some excerpts from various ballet composers as conducted and re-arranged by John Lanchbery. It was filmed at the Royal Opera House under the direction of Ninette de Valois.

Synopsis 
The film's opening credits were accompanied by the excerpt from the final act of Swan Lake. The film included four parts, with an eight-minute encore of Le Corsaire.

Les Syphides 
The first part of the short ballet piece called Les Sylphides by Frédéric Chopin, then re-orchestrated by Roy Douglas into canonical order:

 Prelude in A major, Op. 28, No. 7 (also transcribed in A major)
 Nocturne in A major, Op. 32, No. 2
 Waltz in G major, Op. 70, No. 1 (also transcribed in G major)
 Mazurka in D major, Op. 33, No. 2
 Mazurka in C major, Op. 33, No. 3
 Prelude in A major, Op. 28, No. 7
 Waltz in C minor, Op. 64, No. 2
 Grande valse brillante in E major, Op. 18

This was the first dual role of Margot Fonteyn and Rudolf Nureyev, during the 1962 production was choreographed by Michel Fokine.

Le Corsaire 
In the second part of 'pas de deux' from Le Corsaire by Adolphe Adam, Riccardo Drigo and others, choreographed by Nureyev himself during the 1962 production.

This was the second dual role featuring Nureyev and Fonteyn.

La valse 
The third segment from La valse by Maurice Ravel, and choreographed by Frederick Ashton during the 1958 production, as Ravel noted:

This scene were couples dancing in the ballroom, while male dancers were dressed in white ties, and female dancers were also dressed ball gowns.

Aurora's Wedding 
The last segment from the third act of The Sleeping Beauty composed by Pyotr Ilyich Tchaikovsky. The score were altered by Lanchbery, which included "Trepak" (Russian Dance) segment from The Nutcracker.

It was choreographed by Nicholas Sergeyev, after Marius Petipa.

Reception 
The film was originally released on 5 July 1963 in South Africa, then in the United Kingdom on September, and in the United States on 1 December 1965.

References

External links 
 

1963 documentary films
1963 films
British documentary films
Ballet films
1960s British films